Peter R. Elliott (September 29, 1926 – January 4, 2013) was an American football player and coach. Elliott served as the head football coach at the University of Nebraska–Lincoln (1956), the University of California, Berkeley (1957–1959), the University of Illinois at Urbana-Champaign (1960–1966), and the University of Miami (1973–1974), compiling a career college football record of 56–72–11. From 1979 to 1996, Elliott served as executive director of the Pro Football Hall of Fame.

College
Elliott was an All-American quarterback on the undefeated 1948 Michigan Wolverines football team that won a national championship. He was also a standout basketball player who was first-team All-Big Ten Conference in 1948 and second-team All-Big Ten in 1949 as well as team MVP in 1948. The 1948 team finished third in the eastern region of the NCAA Men's Division I Basketball Championship. Elliott is the only Michigan athlete to have earned 12 letters in varsity sports: football, basketball, and golf.

At Michigan, Elliott played football with his brother Bump, who also became a well known college coach.

Coaching career
After college, Elliot served as an assistant coach at Oregon State University from 1949 to 1950 and the University of Oklahoma from 1951 to 1955. In 1956, he took the head coaching job at Nebraska, lasting one year with a record of 4–6. The next year, he took over at California, where he remained until 1959 with a compiled record of 10–21. In 1958, he led the Golden Bears to an AAWU title and an appearance in the Rose Bowl, where they lost to Iowa.

In 1960, Elliott succeeded Ray Eliot at Illinois and was at the school until 1966. With the Illini, his record was 31–34–1, earning a Big Ten title and Rose Bowl victory over Washington during the 1963 season. He, along with basketball coaches Harry Combes and Howie Braun, was pressured into resigning on March 19, 1967, by the university which was threatened with expulsion by the Big Ten Conference over a slush fund scandal. In 1973, he became head coach at Miami, where he remained for two years and compiled an 11–11 record.

Later life
Elliott served as athletic director at Miami from 1973 to 1978. In March 1978, Elliott rejoined his former boss, Bud Wilkinson, as an assistant with the NFL St. Louis Cardinals. Elliott served as executive director of the Pro Football Hall of Fame from 1979 to 1996 and was serving on its board of trustees. Elliott was also a member of the Sigma Chi fraternity and was selected as a Significant Sig.

Elliott died at the age of 86 of congestive heart failure on January 4, 2013, in Canton, Ohio.

Head coaching record

See also
University of Michigan Athletic Hall of Honor

References

External links
 
 

1926 births
2013 deaths
American men's basketball players
American football quarterbacks
California Golden Bears football coaches
Illinois Fighting Illini football coaches
Miami Hurricanes athletic directors
Miami Hurricanes football coaches
Michigan Wolverines football players
Michigan Wolverines men's basketball players
Michigan Wolverines men's golfers
National Football League announcers
Nebraska Cornhuskers football coaches
Oklahoma Sooners football coaches
Oregon State Beavers football coaches
All-American college men's basketball players
College Football Hall of Fame inductees
Sportspeople from Bloomington, Illinois
Coaches of American football from Illinois
Players of American football from Illinois
Basketball players from Illinois
Golfers from Illinois